Li Xiao is the name of:

Li Xiao (writer) (born 1950), Chinese author
Li Xiao (footballer) (born 1967), Chinese association footballer and coach